This is a list of the bird species recorded in Singapore. The avifauna of Singapore include a total of 459 species, 30 of which have been introduced by humans.

This list's taxonomic treatment (designation and sequence of orders, families and species) and nomenclature (common and scientific names) follow the conventions of The Clements Checklist of Birds of the World, 2022 edition. The family accounts at the beginning of each heading reflect this taxonomy, as do the species counts found in each family account.

The following tags have been used to highlight several categories, but not all species fall into one of these categories. Those that do not are commonly occurring native species.

Abundance
Very common (VC) - found almost all the time in suitable locations
Common (C) - found most of the time in suitable locations
Uncommon (U) - found some of the time
Rare (R) - found several times a year
Very rare (VR) - not found every year
Accidental (A) - a species that rarely or accidentally has occurred in Singapore 
Extirpated (Ex) - used to be found in Singapore, but not any more

Status
Resident (R) - stays throughout the year without known breeding record
Resident breeder (RB) - stays throughout the year with known breeding record
Winter visitor (WV) - spends months at wintering site
Passage migrant (PM) - spends days to weeks at wintering site
Migrant breeder (MB) - breeds locally, but winters elsewhere
Non-breeding visitor (NBV) - can be found throughout the year for days to months, but does not breed locally
Vagrant (V) - not usually found locally
Introduced (I) - either released or escaped birds
Reintroduced (rI) - previously extirpated, but has been re-introduced into the wild

Locations
There are many locations for bird watching in Singapore. The habitats include forests, mangroves, rivers, coasts, grasslands, woodlands, marshes, and offshore islands.

Nature reserves
Bukit Timah Nature Reserve (BTNR) - the forest surrounding the highest peak in Singapore
Central Catchment Nature Reserve (CCNR) - the four reservoirs in central Singapore (MacRitchie, Lower Peirce (LPR), Upper Peirce (UPR) and Upper Seletar (USR)) and surrounding forests
Labrador Nature Reserve (LNR) - the forest and surrounding coast at the southern tip of Singapore
Sungei Buloh Wetland Reserve (SBWR) - the wetland at the north-western tip of Singapore

Offshore islands
There are many islands surrounding mainland Singapore. They often have names carrying the word "pulau" (P.), meaning "island" (Is.) in the Malay language.
 Islands in Johor Strait - including Pulau Punggol, Coney Island, Pulau Tekong, Pulau Ubin
 Islands in Singapore Strait - including Sentosa, Sisters' Islands, St. John Island, Kusu Island, Jurong Island, Pulau Hantu, Pulau Salu, Pulau Semakau
 Pedra Branca - the easternmost end of Singapore Strait

Rivers
There are many rivers in Singapore. They often have names carrying the word "sungei" (S.), meaning "river" in the Malay language.
 Sungei Punggol - a river in the north-eastern part of Singapore. It has been converted into a reservoir in 2011 and is now known as Punggol Reservoir. It contains Sengkang Floating Wetland (SFW) and is beside Sengkang Riverside Park (SRP).
 Sungei Serangoon - a river in the north-eastern part of Singapore. It has been converted into a reservoir in 2011 and is now known as Serangoon Reservoir. It is beside Lorong Halus Wetland and Punggol grassland.

Coasts
There are many coastal habitats around mainland Singapore.
 Lower Seletar Dam (LSD) - a mudflat and sandy beach at north-eastern Singapore. It is the northern border of Lower Seletar Reservoir (LSR).
 Kranji Dam - a dam at north-western Singapore. It is the northern border of the Kranji Reservoir.
 Mandai Mudflat -a mudflat at north-western Singapore. It is a feeding ground for migratory waders.

Parks and gardens
There are many parks and gardens in Singapore. Some of them contain lakes, mangroves, forests, quarries, or rivers. Some are parks in a town, like Ang Mo Kio Town Garden West (AMK TGW) and Choa Chu Kang Park (CCKP). Others are parks in business or industrial areas, like Changi Business Park (CBP) and Jurong Eco-Garden (JEG).
Admiralty Park - a park in northern Singapore with a mangrove and a river, Sungei Cina.
Bishan-Ang Mo Kio Park (BAMKP) - urban park along the banks of a former canal located in central Singapore
Bukit Batok Nature Park (BBNP) - a forest near the western part of Singapore with a quarry within.
Dairy Farm Nature Park (DFNP) - the forest adjacent to the north of BTNR, including Wallace Education Centre and Singapore Quarry
Hindhede Nature Park (HNP) - the forest adjacent to the south-west of BTNR, including Hindhede Quarry.
Jurong Lake Gardens (JLG) - includes the gardens surrounding the Jurong Lake, such as Chinese Garden and Japanese Garden.
Pasir Ris Park (PRP) - a park in north-eastern Singapore containing Sungei Api Api and a mangrove board walk.
Satay by the Bay (SBTB) is a part of the bigger Gardens by the Bay in south-eastern Singapore (formerly Marina South)
Singapore Botanic Gardens (SBG) - Singapore's only UNESCO site containing three lakes (Eco, Symphony and Swan).
Southern Ridges - contains Kent Ridge Park (KRP), Mount Faber Park (MFP) and Telok Blangah Hill Park (TBHP).
Tampines Eco Green (TEG) - a park in eastern Singapore.
West Coast Park (WCP) - a park in south-western Singapore.

Cemeteries
Cemeteries, present or past, are good nature areas because they are left undisturbed most of the time.
Bidadari Cemetery - the former cemetery along Upper Aljunied Road
Bukit Brown Cemetery (BBC) - the former cemetery along Lornie Road
Choa Chu Kang Cemetery (CCKC) - the cemeteries along Lim Chu Kang Road

Other locations
The other locations include reclaimed lands, woodlands and military grounds
Changi - the reclaimed land and coast at eastern Singapore
Neo Tiew Lane (NTL) - the area from Neo Tiew Lane 1 to 3, including Kranji Marshes, Turut Track
Western Water Catchment (WWC) - the four reservoirs in western Singapore (Tengeh, Poyan, Murai and Sarimbun) and surrounding forests
 Tuas - the reclaimed land and coast at southwestern Singapore

Ducks, geese, and waterfowl
Order: AnseriformesFamily: Anatidae

Anatidae includes the ducks and most duck-like waterfowl, such as geese and swans. These birds are adapted to an aquatic existence with webbed feet, flattened bills, and feathers that are excellent at shedding water due to an oily coating.

Wandering whistling duck (Dendrocygna arcuata) - U/IRB - SBG, SBTB, WCP, Marina East, Marina South, P. Punggol
Lesser whistling duck (Dendrocygna javanica) - U/RB - Halus, Jurong Central Park, Kranji Marsh, SBTB, SBG, SBWR, WCP, Yishun, P. Punggol, S. Serangoon
Cotton pygmy-goose (Nettapus coromandelianus) - VR/NBV - CCNR, Halus, Kranji Marsh, SBTB, LSR, Poyan, WCP
Garganey (Spatula querquedula) - R/WV - Changi, CCNR, Halus, Poyan, SBWR, Tuas, Marina South, Tanah Merah
Northern shoveler (Spatula clypeata) - VR/WV - Changi, Halus, Poyan, SBWR (2008)
Gadwall (Mareca strepera) - VR/V - Punggol (1989)
Eurasian wigeon (Mareca penelope) - VR/V - Kranji Marsh (2018), SBWR (1986-7)
Northern pintail (Anas acuta) - VR/WV - Poyan
Green-winged teal (Anas crecca) - VR/V - S. Jurong (1978)
Tufted duck (Aythya fuligula) - VR/V - Changi (1999)

Pheasants, grouse, and allies
Order: GalliformesFamily: Phasianidae

The Phasianidae are a family of terrestrial birds. In general, they are plump (although they vary in size) and have broad, relatively short wings.

Blue-breasted quail (Synoicus chinensis) - R/RB - Changi, Halus, NTL, P. Punggol, Punggol, SBWR, Tuas
Red junglefowl (Gallus gallus) - U/RB+IRB - RB: P. Ubin. IRB: Changi, East Coast, Fort Canning, Poyan, PRP, SBG, LNR, SBTB, SBWR, Sembawang Park, Tampines

Grebes
Order: PodicipediformesFamily: Podicipedidae

Grebes are small to medium-large freshwater diving birds. They have lobed toes and are excellent swimmers and divers. However, they have their feet placed far back on the body, making them quite ungainly on land.

Little grebe (Tachybaptus ruficollis) - U/RB - Halus, P. Ubin, KRP, Kranji Marsh, P. Punggol, Punggol, Singapore Quarry, Tampines Quarry

Pigeons and doves
Order: ColumbiformesFamily: Columbidae

Pigeons and doves are stout-bodied birds with short necks and short slender bills with a fleshy cere.

Rock pigeon (Columba livia) - VC/IRB - urban areas
Oriental turtle-dove (Streptopelia orientalis) - VR/V - Sisters' Is. (2018)
Red collared-dove (Streptopelia tranquebarica) - C/IRB - Admiralty Park, Changi, Halus, NTL, PRP, P. Punggol, P. Ubin
Spotted dove (Spilopelia chinensis) - VC/RB - urban areas
Asian emerald dove (Chalcophaps indica) - U/RB - Admiralty Park, BBNP, BTNR, CCNR, DFNP, P. Ubin, SBWR
Zebra dove (Geopelia striata) - C/RB - urban areas
Little green-pigeon (Treron olax) - VR/NBV - BTNR, CCNR
Pink-necked green-pigeon (Treron vernans) - C/RB - woodlands
Cinnamon-headed green-pigeon (Treron fulvicollis) - VR/NBV - CCNR, P. Tekong, P. Ubin, SBWR, TEG
Orange-breasted green-pigeon (Treron bicinctus) - VR/NBV - JLG
Ashy-headed green-pigeon (Treron phayrei) - A
Thick-billed green-pigeon (Treron curvirostra) - U/RB - BBC, BTNR, CCNR, DFNP, Springleaf, St. John Is., Sentosa, Marina South
Jambu fruit-dove (Ptilinopus jambu) - U/NBV - BBNP, Bidadari, BTNR, CCNR, Changi, DFNP, JLG, Kranji Marsh, KRP, MFP, P. Punggol, SBG
Green imperial-pigeon (Ducula aenea) - R/RB - BBNP, CBP, Halus, Loyang, PRP, P. Ubin, P. Tekong
Mountain imperial-pigeon (Ducula badia) - VR/V - P. Ubin (2012, 2016-7)
Pied imperial-pigeon (Ducula bicolor) - R/NBV, U/F - NBV: P. Salu, Singapore Strait, Southern Islands; F: BBNP, Bt Batok West, JLG, LNR, Poyan, PRP, Tuas, WCP

Cuckoos
Order: CuculiformesFamily: Cuculidae

The family Cuculidae includes cuckoos, roadrunners and anis. These birds are of variable size with slender bodies, long tails and strong legs. The Old World cuckoos are brood parasites.

Greater coucal (Centropus sinensis) - U/RB - woodlands: CCNR, Halus, Mandai, NTL, Poyan, PRP, SBG, SBWR, TBHP, Venus Dr
Lesser coucal (Centropus bengalensis) - C/RB - grasslands
Chestnut-bellied malkoha (Phaenicophaeus sumatranus) - U/RB - BTNR, CCNR, DFNP, JEG, Mandai, Poyan, TBHP
Chestnut-winged cuckoo (Clamator coromandus) - U/WVPM - Bidadari, CCNR, Changi, SBTB, Halus, JEG, JLG, Murai, Poyan, PRP, P. Punggol, Simpang, SBG, SBWR, TEG, Tuas, Khatib Bongsu, Marina South
Pied cuckoo (Clamator jacobinus) - VR/V - Halus (2013-4, 2015)
Asian koel (Eudynamys scolopacea) - C/RB - Islandwide (including offshore islands)
Asian emerald cuckoo (Chrysococcyx maculatus) - VR/V - JLG (2021), P. Ubin (2021), Sentosa (2017-8), Ulu Pandan Park Connector (2020)
Violet cuckoo (Chrysococcyx xanthorhynchus) - U/RBWV - BBNP, BTNR, CCNR, DFNP, JEG, Mandai, NTL, PRP, Poyan, P. Ubin, SBG, Simpang, Springleaf
Horsfield's bronze-cuckoo (Chrysococcyx basalis) - R/WV - Changi Beach, CCKC, Halus, Kranji, P. Punggol, P. Tekong, Punggol, Sentosa, Tuas, Marina East, Marina South
Little bronze-cuckoo (Chrysococcyx minutillus) - U/RB - woodlands
Banded bay cuckoo (Cacomantis sonnerati) - U/RB - Bidadari, BBNP, BTNR, CCNR, Halus, Marina East, NTL, P. Ubin, SBWR
Plaintive cuckoo (Cacomantis merulinus) - U/RB - Bidadari, BBNP, BTNR, CCNR, Changi, Halus, JLG, NTL, P. Punggol, P. Ubin, Poyan, PRP, Punggol, SBWR, Tampines, Tuas
Brush cuckoo (Cacomantis variolosus) - U/RB - Bidadari, BTNR, CCNR, Coney Is., Halus, JLG, NTL, Poyan, P. Tekong, P. Ubin, PRP, SBG, SBWR, Sentosa, Khatib Bongsu
Square-tailed drongo-cuckoo (Surniculus lugubris) - U/RBWV - Bidadari, BBNP, BTNR, CCNR, JLG, Mandai, NTL, PRP, Poyan, SBG, SBWR
Large hawk-cuckoo (Hierococcyx sparverioides) - R/WVPM - Bidadari, CCNR, Changi, JLG, P. Punggol, PRP, Sentosa, Tuas, Khatib Bongsu
Hodgson's hawk-cuckoo (Hierococcyx nisicolor) - R/WVPM - Bidadari, BTNR, CCNR, Changi, CCKC, Coney Is., JLG, Kusu Is., Mandai, PRP, Poyan, P. Punggol, Sembawang, Tuas
Malaysian hawk-cuckoo (Hierococcyx fugax) - R/NBV - BAMKP, Bidadari, BTNR, CCNR, Halus, JLG, Poyan, SBWR
Indian cuckoo (Cuculus micropterus) - U/WVPM - Bidadari, BTNR, CCNR, Changi, JLG, Mandai, MFP, NTL, Poyan, P. Punggol, SBG, SBWR, Sembawang, Sentosa, Tuas
Himalayan cuckoo (Cuculus saturatus) - R/PM - Bidadari, BBNP, CCNR, Coney Is., JLG, Tuas

Nightjars and allies
Order: CaprimulgiformesFamily: Caprimulgidae

Nightjars are medium-sized nocturnal birds that usually nest on the ground. They have long wings, short legs and very short bills. Most have small feet, of little use for walking, and long pointed wings. Their soft plumage is camouflaged to resemble bark or leaves.

Malaysian eared-nightjar (Eurostopodus temminckii) - VR/NBV - BBNP, CCNR
Gray nightjar (Caprimulgus jotaka) - R/WVPM - Bidadari, CCNR, Changi, JLG, SBWR, TBHP
Large-tailed nightjar (Caprimulgus macrurus) - C/RB - woodlands
Savanna nightjar (Caprimulgus affinis) - U/RB - grasslands: Changi, Halus, NTL, P. Ubin, Punggol, Seletar East, TEG, Tuas

Swifts
Order: CaprimulgiformesFamily: Apodidae

Swifts are small birds which spend the majority of their lives flying. These birds have very short legs and never settle voluntarily on the ground, perching instead only on vertical surfaces. Many swifts have long swept-back wings which resemble a crescent or boomerang.

Silver-rumped needletail (Rhaphidura leucopygialis) - VR/NBV - CCNR, Changi, Poyan
White-throated needletail (Hirundapus caudacutus) - VR/PM - BTNR, CCNR, Henderson Waves
Silver-backed needletail (Hirundapus cochinchinensis) - R/WVPM - BTNR, CCNR, DFNP, Henderson Waves
Brown-backed needletail (Hirundapus giganteus) - U/WVPM - BTNR, CCNR, Henderson Waves, Marina East, P. Ubin
Plume-toed swiftlet (Collocalia affinis) - U/R - BBNP, BTNR, CCNR
Black-nest swiftlet (Aerodramus maxima) - C/RB - islandwide, including offshore islands
Germain's swiftlet (Aerodramus germani) - C/RB - islandwide, including offshore islands 
Common swift (Apus apus) - VR/V - CCNR, Henderson Waves
Pacific swift (Apus pacificus) - U/WVPM - BTNR, CCNR, KRP, P. Ubin, Singapore Strait, Tuas
House swift (Apus nipalensis) - U/RB - Buangkok, Changi, CCNR, DFNP, Halus, Henderson Waves, NTL, P. Punggol, P. Ubin, Tuas
Asian palm-swift (Cypsiurus balasiensis) - U/RB - BTNR, CCKC, CCNR, Halus, KRP, Poyan, P. Ubin

Treeswifts
Order: CaprimulgiformesFamily: Hemiprocnidae

The treeswifts, also called crested swifts, are closely related to the true swifts. They differ from the other swifts in that they have crests, long forked tails and softer plumage.

Gray-rumped treeswift (Hemiprocne longipennis) - C/RB - BAMKP, BBNP, Bidadari, CCNR, KRP, Mandai, SBG, TBHP
Whiskered treeswift (Hemiprocne comata) - VR/NBV - BTNR, CCNR

Rails, gallinules and coots
Order: GruiformesFamily: Rallidae

Rallidae is a large family of small to medium-sized birds which includes the rails, crakes, coots and gallinules. Typically they inhabit dense vegetation in damp environments near lakes, swamps or rivers. In general they are shy and secretive birds, making them difficult to observe. Most species have strong legs and long toes which are well adapted to soft uneven surfaces. They tend to have short, rounded wings and to be weak fliers.

Slaty-breasted rail (Lewinia striata) - U/RB - tall grass areas
Eurasian moorhen (Gallinula chloropus) - U/RB - Halus, Kranji Marsh, Poyan, WCP, Marina South, P. Punggol, Serangoon
Eurasian coot (Fulica atra) - VR/V - Poyan
Gray-headed swamphen (Porphyrio poliocephalus) - R/RB - Halus, Kranji Marsh, Neo Tiew, Poyan, TEG
Watercock (Gallicrex cinerea) - U/WV - Changi, Halus, Jurong East, Kranji Marsh, Marina East, Poyan, SBG, SBWR, Tuas, Khatib Bongsu, Marina South
White-breasted waterhen (Amaurornis phoenicurus) - C/RBWV - islandwide
White-browed crake (Poliolimnas cinereus) - U/RB - Halus, Kranji Marsh, SBWR, Punggol
Red-legged crake (Rallina fasciata) - U/RBWV - BBNP, BBC, BTNR, CCNR, Halus, MFP, P. Ubin, SBG, SBWR
Slaty-legged crake (Rallina eurizonoides) - VR/WVPM - Admiralty Park, Bedok, Haig Road, Jurong Is., JLG, LPR, Sentosa, Punggol
Ruddy-breasted crake (Zapornia fusca) - U/RBWV - BAMKP, Changi, Halus, Kranji Marsh, LSR, Punggol, P. Punggol, Tampines, Tuas, Marina South
Band-bellied crake (Zapornia paykullii) - VR/PM - JLG (2011, 2014), SBG (2018)
Baillon's crake (Zapornia pusilla) - R/WVPM - Bt. Batok, Halus, Marina East, NTL, SBTB, Tampines, Tuas, P. Punggol

Finfoots
Order: GruiformesFamily: Heliornithidae

Heliornithidae is a small family of tropical birds with webbed lobes on their feet similar to those of grebes and coots.

Masked finfoot (Heliopais personata) - VR/V - SBWR (1999), USR (2002, 2010)

Thick-knees
Order: CharadriiformesFamily: Burhinidae

The thick-knees are a group of largely tropical waders in the family Burhinidae. They are found worldwide within the tropical zone, with some species also breeding in temperate Europe and Australia. They are medium to large waders with strong black or yellow-black bills, large yellow eyes and cryptic plumage. Despite being classed as waders, most species have a preference for arid or semi-arid habitats.

Beach thick-knee (Esacus magnirostris) - Ex/R - Southern Islands

Stilts and avocets
Order: CharadriiformesFamily: Recurvirostridae

Recurvirostridae is a family of large wading birds, which includes the avocets and stilts. The avocets have long legs and long up-curved bills. The stilts have extremely long legs and long, thin, straight bills.

Black-winged stilt (Himantopus himantopus) - VR/WVPM+RB - WVPM: Changi, Kranji Marsh, LSD, SBWR, P. Punggol. RB: P. Tekong (2019)
Pied stilt (Himantopus leucocephalus) - VR/RB - P. Tekong (2019)

Plovers and lapwings
Order: CharadriiformesFamily: Charadriidae

The family Charadriidae includes the plovers, dotterels and lapwings. They are small to medium-sized birds with compact bodies, short, thick necks and long, usually pointed, wings. They are found in open country worldwide, mostly in habitats near water.

Black-bellied plover (Pluvialis squatarola) - U/WVPM - Changi, P. Tekong, P. Ubin, SBWR
Pacific golden-plover (Pluvialis fulva) - C/WVPM - rivers, coasts, mudflats, open areas
Gray-headed lapwing (Vanellus cinereus) - VR/V - Kranji, Marina East, NTL, SBG, SBWR, Tuas
Red-wattled lapwing (Vanellus indicus) - U/RB - Bt. Batok West, Changi, Kranji, Marina East, NTL, Punggol, P. Punggol, P. Tekong, P. Ubin, SBWR, Sarimbun, Tuas, Warren
Masked lapwing (Vanellus miles) - U/F - Mandai, Marine East, Seletar West, Tanjong Rhu
Lesser sand-plover (Charadrius mongolus) - C/WVPM - rivers, coasts, mudflats
Greater sand-plover (Charadrius leschenaultii) - U/WVPM - Changi, LSD, Marina East, SBWR
Malaysian plover (Charadrius peronii) - U/RB - Changi, Halus, LSD, Marina East, P. Semakau, Tuas
Kentish plover (Charadrius alexandrinus) - U/WVPM - Changi, Marina East, Tuas
White-faced plover (Charadrius dealbatus) - U/WVPM - Changi, Marina East
Javan plover (Charadrius javanicus) - VR/NBV - Marina East, P. Tekong
Common ringed plover (Charadrius hiaticula) - VR/PM - Changi, SBWR
Little ringed plover (Charadrius dubius) - U/WVPM - open areas, rivers, coasts
Oriental plover (Charadrius veredus) - VR/PM - Changi, LSD, Tuas

Painted-snipes
Order: CharadriiformesFamily: Rostratulidae

Painted-snipes are short-legged, long-billed birds similar in shape to the true snipes, but more brightly coloured.

Greater painted-snipe (Rostratula benghalensis) - R/RB - Halus, Jurong Central Park, Jurong West, Kranji Marsh, Marina East, Pasir Ris Farmway, Punggol, Tuas, SBG

Jacanas
Order: CharadriiformesFamily: Jacanidae

The jacanas are a group of tropical waders in the family Jacanidae. They are found throughout the tropics. They are identifiable by their huge feet and claws which enable them to walk on floating vegetation in the shallow lakes that are their preferred habitat.

Pheasant-tailed jacana (Hydrophasianus chirurgus) - VR/WV - Halus, HNP (Hindhede Quarry), Marina East, NTL (Kranji Marshes), SBTB, SBWR

Sandpipers and allies
Order: CharadriiformesFamily: Scolopacidae

Scolopacidae is a large diverse family of small to medium-sized shorebirds including the sandpipers, curlews, godwits, shanks, tattlers, woodcocks, snipes, dowitchers and phalaropes. The majority of these species eat small invertebrates picked out of the mud or soil. Variation in length of legs and bills enables multiple species to feed in the same habitat, particularly on the coast, without direct competition for food.

Eurasian Whimbrel (Numenius phaeopus) - C/WVPM - rivers, coasts, mudflats
Little curlew (Numenius minutus) - VR/V - Tuas (1997)
Far Eastern curlew (Numenius madagascariensis) - VR/PM - Changi, SBWR
Eurasian curlew (Numenius arquata) - R/WVPM - Changi, P. Tekong, P. Ubin, SBWR, Tuas
Bar-tailed godwit (Limosa lapponica) - U/WVPM - Changi, Mandai Mudflat, P. Ubin, SBWR
Black-tailed godwit (Limosa limosa) - U/WVPM - Changi, Mandai Mudflat, SBWR
Ruddy turnstone (Arenaria interpres) - U/WV - Changi, Halus, LSD, Mandai Mudflat, P. Tekong, SBWR
Great knot (Calidris tenuirostris) - R/PM - Changi, LSD, Mandai Mudflat, SBWR
Red knot (Calidris canutus) - VR/WV - SBWR
Ruff (Calidris pugnax) - VR/WV - Changi, SBWR
Broad-billed sandpiper (Calidris falcinellus) - U/WVPM - Changi, Mandai Mudflat, SBWR
Sharp-tailed sandpiper (Calidris acuminata) - R/V - Changi
Curlew sandpiper (Calidris ferruginea) - U/WVPM - Changi, LSD, Mandai Mudflat, P. Tekong, SBWR
Temminck's stint (Calidris temminckii) - VR/PM
Long-toed stint (Calidris subminuta) - R/WVPM - Changi, NTL, Pulau Punggol, SBWR, Tuas
Spoon-billed sandpiper (Calidris pygmeus) - VR/WV - Changi
Red-necked stint (Calidris ruficollis) - U/WVPM - Changi, Mandai Mudflat, P. Ubin, SBWR
Sanderling (Calidris alba) - U/WV - Changi, LSD, P. Tekong, SBWR
Dunlin (Calidris alpina) - VR/PM - Changi
Little stint (Calidris minuta) - VR/PM - P. Ubin (2017)
Pectoral sandpiper (Calidris melanotos) - R/V - Changi
Asian dowitcher (Limnodromus semipalmatus) - U/WVPM - Changi, Halus, P. Ubin, SBWR
Eurasian woodcock (Scolopax rusticola) - VR/V
Common snipe (Gallinago gallinago) - U/WV - Changi, JLG, Halus, Poyan, SBWR, Tuas, Venus Drive, Khatib Bongsu, P. Punggol, Punggol
Pin-tailed snipe (Gallinago stenura) - U/WV - Changi, CCKC, Halus, JLG, Punggol, P. Ubin, SBWR, Tuas, Warren
Swinhoe's snipe (Gallinago megala) - R/WV - Changi, Jurong West, Punggol, NTL
Terek sandpiper (Xenus cinereus) - U/WVPM - Changi, LSD, Mandai Mudflat, P. Tekong, P. Ubin, SBWR
Red-necked phalarope (Phalaropus lobatus) - VR/WV - P. Tekong, Singapore Strait
Common sandpiper (Actitis hypoleucos) - VC/WVPM - waterbodies
Green sandpiper (Tringa ochropus) - VR/WV - CCK, NTL, SBWR
Gray-tailed tattler (Tringa brevipes) - U/WVPM - Changi, Mandai Mudflat, SBWR
Spotted redshank (Tringa erythropus) - VR/WV - Punggol, SBWR
Common greenshank (Tringa nebularia) - VC/WVPM - rivers, coasts, mudflats
Nordmann's greenshank (Tringa guttifer) - VR/WV - Changi, SBWR
Marsh sandpiper (Tringa stagnatilis) - U/WVPM - rivers, coasts, mudflats
Wood sandpiper (Tringa glareola) - U/WVPM - Changi, Halus, JLG, NTL, Punggol, P. Punggol, SBWR, Tuas
Common redshank (Tringa totanus) - VC/WVPM - rivers, coasts, mudflats

Buttonquail
Order: CharadriiformesFamily: Turnicidae

The buttonquail are small, drab, running birds which resemble the true quails. The female is the brighter of the sexes and initiates courtship. The male incubates the eggs and tends the young.

Barred buttonquail (Turnix suscitator) - U/RB - Changi, Coney Is., Halus, NTL, P. Punggol, P. Ubin, Punggol, TEG, Tuas

Pratincoles and coursers
Order: CharadriiformesFamily: Glareolidae

Glareolidae is a family of wading birds comprising the pratincoles, which have short legs, long pointed wings and long forked tails, and the coursers, which have long legs, short wings and long, pointed bills which curve downwards.

Oriental pratincole (Glareola maldivarum) - U/PM - CCNR, Changi, Henderson Waves, Kranji Marsh, Punggol, P. Punggol, P. Semakau, P. Ubin, Tuas
Small pratincole (Glareola lactea) - VR/PM - Changi, P. Punggol

Skuas and jaegers
Order: CharadriiformesFamily: Stercorariidae

The family Stercorariidae are, in general, medium to large birds, typically with grey or brown plumage, often with white markings on the wings. They nest on the ground in temperate and arctic regions and are long-distance migrants.

Pomarine jaeger (Stercorarius pomarinus) - R/WV - Singapore Strait
Parasitic jaeger (Stercorarius parasiticus) - R/WV - P. Punggol, Singapore Strait
Long-tailed jaeger (Stercorarius longicaudus) - R/WV - Singapore Strait

Gulls, terns, and skimmers
Order: CharadriiformesFamily: Laridae

Laridae is a family of medium to large seabirds, the gulls, terns, and skimmers. Gulls are typically grey or white, often with black markings on the head or wings. They have stout, longish bills and webbed feet. Terns are a group of generally medium to large seabirds typically with grey or white plumage, often with black markings on the head. Most terns hunt fish by diving but some pick insects off the surface of fresh water. Terns are generally long-lived birds, with several species known to live in excess of 30 years.

Black-headed gull (Chroicocephalus ridibundus) - R/WV - LSD, Mandai Mudflat, P. Ubin, Singapore Strait
Brown-headed gull (Chroicocephalus brunnicephalus) - VR/V - Johor Strait, Kranji
Lesser black-backed gull (Larus fuscus) - VR/V - Singapore Strait (2011)
Bridled tern (Onychoprion anaethetus) - U/RB, C/PM - Pedra Branca, Singapore Strait
Aleutian tern (Onychoprion aleuticus) - U/WV - Singapore Strait
Little tern (Sternula albifrons) - C/RBWV - inland (nest), rivers, coasts, seas
Gull-billed tern (Gelochelidon nilotica) - R/WVPM - Changi, Mandai Mudflat, P. Tekong, P. Ubin, Sentosa, Singapore Strait
Caspian tern (Hydroprogne caspia) - R/WV - Mandai Mudflat
White-winged tern (Chlidonias leucopterus) - U/WVPM - rivers, coasts, seas
Whiskered tern (Chlidonias hybrida) - R/WVPM - Halus, Johor Strait, JLG, Kranji Dam, Serangoon, Singapore Strait
Roseate tern (Sterna dougallii) - VR/V - Pedra Branca
Black-naped tern (Sterna sumatrana) - U/RB - Changi, Johor Strait, Pedra Branca, P. Tekong, P. Ubin, Singapore Strait
Common tern (Sterna hirundo) - U/WV - Changi, Halus, Mandai Mudflat, Singapore Strait
Great crested tern (Thalasseus bergii) - C/WV - Changi, Johor Strait, Mandai Mudflat, Pedra Branca, P. Ubin, Singapore Strait
Lesser crested tern (Thalasseus bengalensis) - U/WV - Changi, Johor Strait, Mandai Mudflat, Pedra Branca, P. Ubin, Punggol, Singapore Strait

Tropicbirds
Order: PhaethontiformesFamily: Phaethontidae

Tropicbirds are slender white birds of tropical oceans, with exceptionally long central tail feathers. Their heads and long wings have black markings.

White-tailed tropicbird (Phaethon lepturus) - VR/V - Tuas (2015)
Red-billed tropicbird (Phaethon rubricauda) - VR/V - S. Serangoon (1986)

Northern storm-petrels
Order: ProcellariiformesFamily: Hydrobatidae

Though the members of this family are similar in many respects to the southern storm-petrels, including their general appearance and habits, there are enough genetic differences to warrant their placement in a separate family.

Swinhoe's storm-petrel (Hydrobates monorhis) - C/PM - P. Ubin, Singapore Strait

Shearwaters and petrels
Order: ProcellariiformesFamily: Procellariidae

The procellariids are the main group of medium-sized "true petrels", characterised by united nostrils with medium septum and a long outer functional primary.

Bulwer's petrel (Bulweria bulwerii) - R/PM - Singapore Strait
Streaked shearwater (Calonectris leucomelas) - A
Short-tailed shearwater (Ardenna tenuirostris) - U/PM - Singapore Strait
Wedge-tailed shearwater (Ardenna pacifica) - VR/V - BAMKP (2021)

Storks
Order: CiconiiformesFamily: Ciconiidae

Storks are large, long-legged, long-necked, wading birds with long, stout bills. Storks are mute, but bill-clattering is an important mode of communication at the nest. Their nests can be large and may be reused for many years. Many species are migratory.

Asian openbill (Anastomus oscitans) - U/WV - NTL/P. Punggol/Seletar West (2013), SBWR (2019), island-wide (Dec 2019)
Lesser adjutant (Leptoptilos javanicus) - Ex/RB, R/NBV - Kranji Marsh, P. Ubin, SBWR, WWC
Milky stork (Mycteria cinerea) - U/F - Admiralty Park, JLG, SBWR
Painted stork (Mycteria leucocephala) - U/F - Admiralty Park, JLG, SBWR

Frigatebirds
Order: SuliformesFamily: Fregatidae

Frigatebirds are large seabirds usually found over tropical oceans. They are large, black-and-white or completely black, with long wings and deeply forked tails. The males have coloured inflatable throat pouches. They do not swim or walk and cannot take off from a flat surface. Having the largest wingspan-to-body-weight ratio of any bird, they are essentially aerial, able to stay aloft for more than a week.

Lesser frigatebird (Fregata ariel) - VR/NBV - Pedra Branca, Singapore Strait
Christmas Island frigatebird (Fregata andrewsi) - VR/NBV - P. Ubin, Singapore Strait, SBWR

Boobies and gannets
Order: SuliformesFamily: Sulidae

The sulids comprise the gannets and boobies. Both groups are medium to large coastal seabirds that plunge-dive for fish.

Brown booby (Sula leucogaster) - VR/V - Pedra Branca, SBWR (2016), Singapore Strait
Red-footed booby (Sula sula) - VR/V - CCKC (2011), Singapore Strait (2012, 2016), St. John Is. (2019), Marina East (2017, carcass)

Anhingas
Order: SuliformesFamily: Anhingidae

Anhingas or darters are often called "snake-birds" because of their long thin neck, which gives a snake-like appearance when they swim with their bodies submerged. The males have black and dark-brown plumage, an erectile crest on the nape and a larger bill than the female. The females have much paler plumage especially on the neck and underparts. The darters have completely webbed feet and their legs are short and set far back on the body. Their plumage is somewhat permeable, like that of cormorants, and they spread their wings to dry after diving.

Oriental darter (Anhinga melanogaster) - R/NBV - Bukit Gombak, Hindhede Quarry, Kranji, P. Ubin, Singapore Quarry

Cormorants and shags
Order: SuliformesFamily: Phalacrocoracidae

Phalacrocoracidae is a family of medium to large coastal, fish-eating seabirds that includes cormorants and shags. Plumage colouration varies, with the majority having mainly dark plumage, some species being black-and-white and a few being colourful.

Great cormorant (Phalacrocorax carbo) - U/F - Changi, JLG, Johor Strait, Kranji Dam, Mandai Mudflat, Tuas

Pelicans
Order: PelecaniformesFamily: Pelecanidae

Pelicans are large water birds with a distinctive pouch under their beak. As with other members of the order Pelecaniformes, they have webbed feet with four toes.

Spot-billed pelican (Pelecanus philippensis) - R/F - Kranji, NTL, P. Ubin, Seletar, SBWR

Herons, egrets, and bitterns

Order: PelecaniformesFamily: Ardeidae

The family Ardeidae contains the bitterns, herons and egrets. Herons and egrets are medium to large wading birds with long necks and legs. Bitterns tend to be shorter necked and more wary. Members of Ardeidae fly with their necks retracted, unlike other long-necked birds such as storks, ibises and spoonbills.

Yellow bittern (Ixobrychus sinensis) - C/RBWV - reeds
Schrenck's bittern (Ixobrychus eurhythmus) - R/WV - CCNR, Changi, Halus, JLG, Jurong West, PRP, Punggol, Sengkang, SBG, SBTB, SBWR, Tuas, Venus Drive
Cinnamon bittern (Ixobrychus cinnamomeus) - U/RBWV - Bidadari, CCKC, Changi, Halus, JLG, NTL, PRP, SBG, SBWR, Tuas, Jurong West, P. Punggol, Seletar West
Black bittern (Ixobrychus flavicollis) - U/WVPM - BAMKP, CCNR, DFNP, Hindhede Quarry, JEG, JLG, Halus, PRP, P. Ubin, SBG, SBTB, SBWR, Tuas
Gray heron (Ardea cinerea) - C/RB - waterbodies
Great-billed heron (Ardea sumatrana) - U/RB - Changi, Coney Is., Jurong Is., JLG, LNR, LSD, KRP, Poyan, P. Hantu, P. Jong, P. Punggol, P. Semakau, P. Tekong, P. Ubin, Sentosa, SBWR, WCP, Tuas
Purple heron (Ardea purpurea) - C/RB - grassfields, waterbodies
Great egret (Ardea alba) - C/WV - waterbodies
Intermediate egret (Ardea intermedia) - C/WV - grassfields, waterbodies
Chinese egret (Egretta eulophotes) - R/WV - Changi, PRP, P. Ubin, SBWR, S. Serangoon
Little egret (Egretta garzetta) - C/WV - waterbodies
Pacific reef-heron (Egretta sacra) - U/R - Changi, LSD, Marina Barrage, P. Hantu, P. Semakau, P. Ubin, PRP, Siglap Canal, SBWR, WCP, S. Punggol, S. Serangoon
Cattle egret (Bubulcus ibis) - C/WV - grassfields
Indian pond-heron (Ardeola grayii) - VR/V - Bidadari (2015, 2016), Pasir Ris Farmway (2012, 2016), Senoko (1994)
Chinese pond-heron (Ardeola bacchus) - C/WV - Changi, Halus, JLG, LNR, Poyan, SBWR, Marina South
Javan pond-heron (Ardeola speciosa) - U/WV - Pasir Ris Farmway, SBWR, S. Serangoon
Striated heron (Butorides striatus) - C/RBWV - waterbodies
Black-crowned night-heron (Nycticorax nycticorax) - U/RB - waterbodies
Malayan night-heron (Gorsachius melanolophus) - R/WVPM - Bidadari, CCNR, Halus, JLG, NTL, SBG, Tuas

Ibises and spoonbills
Order: PelecaniformesFamily: Threskiornithidae

Threskiornithidae is a family of large terrestrial and wading birds which includes the ibises and spoonbills. They have long, broad wings with 11 primary and about 20 secondary feathers. They are strong fliers and despite their size and weight, very capable soarers.

Glossy ibis (Plegadis falcinellus) - VR/V - Halus (1984), Kranji Dam (2019), Sime Road (1992, 2007), SBWR (1989)

Osprey
Order: AccipitriformesFamily: Pandionidae

The family Pandionidae contains only one species, the osprey. The osprey is a medium-large raptor which is a specialist fish-eater with a worldwide distribution.

Osprey (Pandion haliaetus) - U/NBV - Changi, DFNP, Halus, Henderson Waves, Kranji, Mandai Mudflat, NTL, P. Punggol, P. Tekong, P. Ubin, PRP, SBWR, Sembawang Park, S. Punggol, S. Serangoon

Hawks, eagles, and kites
Order: AccipitriformesFamily: Accipitridae

Accipitridae is a family of birds of prey, which includes hawks, eagles, kites, harriers and Old World vultures. These birds have powerful hooked beaks for tearing flesh from their prey, strong legs, powerful talons and keen eyesight.

Black-winged kite (Elanus caeruleus) - C/RB - grasslands
Oriental honey-buzzard (Pernis ptilorhyncus) - orientalis: C/WVPM, torquatus: U/NBV - WVPM: islandwide. NBV: Bidadari, CCNR, Poyan, PRP, Tampines, TBHP, Toa Payoh, USR, Warren
Jerdon's baza (Aviceda jerdoni) - U/WVPM - AMK TGW, Bidadari, BTNR, CCKC, CCNR, Changi, Clementi, DFNP, Halus, JLG, PRP, Poyan, Springleaf, TEG, Marina South
Black baza (Aviceda leuphotes) - C/WVPM - islandwide
Cinereous vulture (Aegypius monachus) - VR/V - SBG (2021)
Himalayan griffon (Gyps himalayensis) - R/V - AMK, BTNR, Changi, Orchard Road, Simpang, SBG, SBWR, Toa Payoh, Tuas, Telok Ayer
Crested serpent-eagle (Spilornis cheela) - R/R - BTNR, CCNR, Goldhill Avenue, JLG, Malcolm Park, P. Tekong, P. Ubin, Sembawang Park, SBG, Springleaf, SBWR
Short-toed snake-eagle (Circaetus gallicus) - VR/PM - CCNR, Changi, Henderson Waves, JLG, Halus, NTL, SBWR, Tuas
Bat hawk (Macheiramphus alcinus) - VR/NBV - MacRitchie, P. Ubin
Changeable hawk-eagle (Nisaetus cirrhatus) - U/RB - forests, woodlands
Rufous-bellied eagle (Hieraaetus kienerii) - R/WVPM - BBNP, BBC, BTNR, CCNR, Halus, Pang Sua, SBG, SBWR, Swiss Club Road
Greater spotted eagle (Clanga clanga) - VR/WV - Changi, Henderson Waves, Murai, NTL, P. Punggol, SBG, Tuas
Booted eagle (Hieraaetus pennatus) - U/WV - Bidadari, Bukit Panjang, CCKC, CCNR, Changi, Poyan, Punggol, P. Punggol, Tuas
Steppe eagle (Aquila nipalensis) - VR/V - Changi, Pasir Ris, Halus, Tuas, Punggol, S. Serangoon
Imperial eagle (Aquila heliaca) - VR/V - Changi, P. Ubin (2016-7), Punggol
Gray-faced buzzard (Butastur indicus) - U/WV - BBNP, CCNR, Changi, Henderson Waves, P. Ubin, SBWR, Tuas
Eastern marsh-harrier (Circus spilonotus) - U/WV - Changi, Henderson Waves, NTL, Poyan, P. Semakau, Sengkang, SBWR, Tuas
Hen harrier (Circus cyaneus) - VR/WV - Halus, Poyan
Pied harrier (Circus melanoleucos) - R/WV - Changi, NTL, P. Punggol, SBWR, TBHP, Tuas
Crested goshawk (Accipiter trivirgatus) - U/RB - AMK TGW, BAMKP, Bedok, BTNR, CCNR, Changi, Goldhill Ave, JLG, Kranji Dam, NTL, PRP, Punggol, P. Ubin, SBG, SBTB, Sembawang Park, Sentosa, Southern Ridges, Zoo
Shikra (Accipiter badius) - VR/V - CCNR (2019), Changi (2012)
Chinese sparrowhawk (Accipiter soloensis) - U/WVPM - AMK TGW, CCNR, Changi, Coney Is., JLG, LSD, NTL, P. Punggol, P. Ubin, PRP, SBG, SBWR, Southern Ridges, Tuas, WCP
Japanese sparrowhawk (Accipiter gularis) - C/WVPM - islandwide
Besra (Accipiter virgatus) - R/PM - Changi, Henderson Waves, Tuas
Eurasian sparrowhawk (Accipiter nisus) - VR/V - Henderson Waves (2016, 2017), TBHP (2018), Tuas (2010)
Black kite (Milvus migrans) - U/WV - BBNP, CCNR, Changi, Jurong West, NTL, Punggol, P. Punggol, P. Ubin, Seletar Camp, SBWR, Tuas, Marina South
Brahminy kite (Haliastur indus) - C/RB - islandwide
White-bellied sea-eagle (Haliaeetus leucogaster) - C/RB - islandwide near water
Gray-headed fish-eagle (Ichthyophaga ichthyaetus) - U/RB - CCNR, Changi, JLG, Little Guilin, LSR, NTL, Poyan, Seletar Camp, SBG, Springleaf, SBWR, Tampines
Common buzzard (Buteo buteo)
Himalayan buzzard (Buteo refectus) - A
Eastern buzzard (Buteo japonicus) - U/WV - Airport Road, Bidadari, BBNP, Changi, Halus, Henderson Waves, Holland Road, JLG, KRP, Seletar West, Sembawang Park, Sentosa, Tuas
Long-legged buzzard (Buteo rufinus) - A
Golden eagle (Aquila chrysaetos) - A - Pasir ris,  Central Catchment Nature Reserve

Barn owls
Order: StrigiformesFamily: Tytonidae

Barn owls are medium to large owls with large heads and characteristic heart-shaped faces. They have long strong legs with powerful talons.
Barn owl (Tyto alba) - U/RB - Changi, Halus, Istana, JLG, Kranji Dam, Marina Barrage, Sentosa, Tanjong Rhu, Toa Payoh, Tuas

Owls
Order: StrigiformesFamily: Strigidae

The typical owls are small to large solitary nocturnal birds of prey. They have large forward-facing eyes and ears, a hawk-like beak and a conspicuous circle of feathers around each eye called a facial disk.

Sunda scops-owl (Otus lempiji) - C/RB - Alexandra Hill, BBC, BBNP, BTNR, CCNR, HNP, P. Ubin, PRP, SBWR, Sentosa
Oriental scops-owl (Otus sunia) - R/WVPM - Bidadari, BTNR, CCKP, CCNR, DFNP, Fort Canning, Kent Road, KRP, Mimosa Walk, MFP, P. Ubin, Seletar Country Club, SBWR
Barred eagle-owl (Bubo sumatranus) - R/RB - BBC, BTNR, CCNR, DFNP, P. Ubin
Brown fish-owl (Ketupa zeylonensis) - A
Buffy fish-owl (Ketupa ketupu) - U/RB - CCNR, JEG, NTL, Poyan, P. Ubin, PRP, SBG, SBWR, Sentosa
Spotted wood-owl (Strix seloputo) - U/RB - Bidadari, Chinatown, City, Dover Road, JLG, PRP, P. Ubin, Poyan, St. John Is., Sentosa, SBG, TBHP, Toa Payoh
Brown wood-owl (Strix leptogrammica) - VR/RB - CCNR, P. Ubin
Long-eared owl (Asio otus) - VR/V - Marina East (2021)
Short-eared owl (Asio flammeus) - VR/V - Changi, Marina East
Brown boobook (Ninox scutulata) - C/RBWV - BTNR, CCNR, HNP, JLG, P. Ubin, Sentosa
Northern boobook (Ninox japonica) - R/PMWV - DFNP, PRP, SBTB, Tuas

Hornbills
Order: BucerotiformesFamily: Bucerotidae

Hornbills are a group of birds whose bill is shaped like a cow's horn, but without a twist, sometimes with a casque on the upper mandible. Frequently, the bill is brightly coloured.

Black hornbill (Anthracoceros malayanus) - R/NBV - P. Ubin
Oriental pied hornbill (Anthracoceros albirostris) - U/rIRB+RB - Bidadari, Pasir Ris, CCNR, Changi Village, P. Ubin, PRP, SBWR, St. John Is.
Rhinoceros hornbill (Buceros rhinoceros) - R/NBV - Pulau ubin
Helmeted hornbill (Rhinoplax vigil) - Ex/R
Wreathed hornbill (Rhyticeros undulatus) - R/NBV - Botanic Garden

Kingfishers
Order: CoraciiformesFamily: Alcedinidae

Kingfishers are medium-sized birds with large heads, long, pointed bills, short legs and stubby tails.

Common kingfisher (Alcedo atthis) - C/WV - water edges
Rufous-collared kingfisher (Actenoides concretus) - Ex/RB
Blue-eared kingfisher (Alcedo meninting) - R/RB - BBNP, CCNR, HNP, NTL, Poyan, P. Ubin, SBTB, SBWR
Black-backed dwarf-kingfisher (Ceyx erithacus) - R/WV - Bidadari, BTNR, CCNR, SBWR, Tuas
Rufous-backed dwarf-kingfisher (Ceyx rufidorsa) - Ex/RB
Stork-billed kingfisher (Pelargopsis capensis) - U/RB - water edges
Ruddy kingfisher (Halcyon coromanda) - R/RBWV - RB: P. Tekong. WV: Bidadari, CBP, CCNR, City, DFNP, Fort Canning, JLG, P. Ubin, SBG, SBWR, Venus Drive
White-throated kingfisher (Halcyon smyrnensis) - C/RB - water edges
Black-capped kingfisher (Halcyon pileata) - U/WV - Bidadari, CCNR, Changi, Halus, JLG, NTL, PRP, SBWR, S. Serangoon, Tuas, LSD
Collared kingfisher (Todirhamphus chloris) - VC/RB - water edges
Pied kingfisher (Ceryle rudis) - A

Bee-eaters
Order: CoraciiformesFamily: Meropidae

The bee-eaters are a group of near passerine birds in the family Meropidae. Most species are found in Africa but others occur in southern Europe, Madagascar, Australia and New Guinea. They are characterised by richly coloured plumage, slender bodies and usually elongated central tail feathers. All are colourful and have long downturned bills and pointed wings, which give them a swallow-like appearance when seen from afar.

Blue-throated bee-eater (Merops viridis) - C/MB - islandwide (including offshore islands)
Blue-tailed bee-eater (Merops philippinus) - C/WV - islandwide (including offshore islands)

Rollers
Order: CoraciiformesFamily: Coraciidae

Rollers resemble crows in size and build, but are more closely related to the kingfishers and bee-eaters. They share the colourful appearance of those groups with blues and browns predominating. The two inner front toes are connected, but the outer toe is not.

Dollarbird (Eurystomus orientalis) - C/RBWV - woodlands

Asian barbets
Order: PiciformesFamily: Megalaimidae

The Asian barbets are plump birds, with short necks and large heads. They get their name from the bristles which fringe their heavy bills. Most species are brightly coloured.

Coppersmith barbet (Psilopogon haemacephalus) - C/RB - woodlands
Red-crowned barbet (Psilopogon rafflesii) - U/RB - BBNP, BTNR, CCNR, Poyan
Lineated barbet (Psilopogon lineatus) - U/IRB - Bidadari, BBNP, BTNR, CCNR, DFNP, HNP, JEG, JLG, NTL, Poyan, SBG, Southern Ridges

Woodpeckers
Order: PiciformesFamily: Picidae

Woodpeckers are small to medium-sized birds with chisel-like beaks, short legs, stiff tails and long tongues used for capturing insects. Some species have feet with two toes pointing forward and two backward, while several species have only three toes. Many woodpeckers have the habit of tapping noisily on tree trunks with their beaks.

Sunda woodpecker (Yungipicus moluccensis) - C/RB - parks
Rufous woodpecker (Micropternus brachyurus) - U/RB - woodlands
Buff-rumped woodpecker (Meiglyptes tristis) - VR/NBV - Bidadari, CCNR, P. Ubin
Common flameback (Dinopium javanense) - C/RB - woodlands
Crimson-winged woodpecker (Picus puniceus) - VR/NBV - BTNR
Laced woodpecker (Picus vittatus) - C/RB - woodlands
Banded woodpecker (Chrysophlegma miniaceum) - C/RB - forests
Great slaty woodpecker (Mulleripicus pulverulentus) - VR/NBV - BTNR
White-bellied woodpecker (Dryocopus javensis) - Ex/R - CCNR

Falcons and caracaras
Order: FalconiformesFamily: Falconidae

Falconidae is a family of diurnal birds of prey. They differ from hawks, eagles and kites in that they kill with their beaks instead of their talons.

Black-thighed falconet (Microhierax fringillarius) - VR/NBV - Goldhill Avenue, Jalan Mashhor, Yishun, CCNR, Sembawang.
Lesser kestrel (Falco naumanni) - VR/WV - Changi (2001, 2010), Simei (2001)
Eurasian kestrel (Falco tinnunculus) - R/WV - Bukit Batok West, Changi, CCKC, JLG, Kranji, KRP, P. Punggol, Tuas, Jurong West
Amur falcon (Falco amurensis) - VR/V - Changi (2007), Halus (2021), LSD (2016), Tanah Merah Coast Road (2017)
Eurasian hobby (Falco subbuteo) - VR/V - Henderson Waves (2020)
Peregrine falcon (Falco peregrinus) - U/WV - islandwide

Cockatoos
Order: PsittaciformesFamily:  Cacatuidae

The cockatoos share many features with other parrots including the characteristic curved beak shape and a zygodactyl foot, with two forward toes and two backwards toes. They differ, however in a number of characteristics, including the often spectacular movable headcrest.

Tanimbar corella (Cacatua goffiniana) - C/IRB - Bidadari, BBNP, Changi Village, LNR, Malcolm Park, MFP, PRP SBG, Sembawang Park, Sentosa, Springleaf
Yellow-crested cockatoo (Cacatua sulphurea) - U/IRB - Bidadari, BAMKP, Changi Village, Clementi, Dover Road, LNR, Malcolm Park, St. John Is., Sentosa, SBG, Southern Ridges
Sulphur-crested cockatoo (Cacatua galerita) - U/IR - Loyang, Sentosa, SBG, Southern Ridges

Old world parrots
Order: PsittaciformesFamily: Psittaculidae

Characteristic features of parrots include a strong curved bill, an upright stance, strong legs, and clawed zygodactyl feet. Many parrots are vividly coloured, and some are multi-coloured. Old World parrots are found from Africa east across south and southeast Asia and Oceania to Australia and New Zealand.

Blue-rumped parrot (Psittinus cyanurus) - R/R - Bukit Batok West, CCNR
Rose-ringed parakeet (Psittacula krameri) - U/IRB - Bidadari, Halus, LSD, Marina East, Poyan, PRP, P. Ubin, Seletar Camp, Sembawang Park, Simpang, SBG
Red-breasted parakeet (Psittacula alexandri) - C/IRB - woodlands
Long-tailed parakeet (Psittacula longicauda) - C/RB - woodlands
Coconut lorikeet (Trichoglossus haematodus) - U/IRB - BAMKP, BBC, Bidadari, BTNR, Buona Vista, CCNR, Goldhill Ave, JLG, SBG, Sentosa
Blue-crowned hanging-parrot (Loriculus galgulus) - U/RB - BAMKP, BBNP, BTNR, CCNR, KRP, Malcolm Park, MFP, SBG

African and green broadbills
Order: PasseriformesFamily: Calyptomenidae

The broadbills are small, brightly coloured birds which feed on fruit and also take insects in flycatcher fashion, snapping their broad bills. Their habitat is canopies of wet forests.

Green broadbill (Calyptomena viridis) - VR/NBV - East Coast Park (2014), P. Ubin (2014, 2021)

Asian and Grauer’s broadbills
Order: PasseriformesFamily: Eurylaimidae

The broadbills are small, brightly coloured birds which feed on fruit and also take insects in flycatcher fashion, snapping their broad bills. Their habitat is canopies of wet forests.

Black-and-red broadbill (Cymbirhynchus macrorhynchos) - VR/NBV - P. Ubin, SBWR

Pittas
Order: PasseriformesFamily: Pittidae

Pittas are medium-sized by passerine standards and are stocky, with fairly long, strong legs, short tails and stout bills. Many are brightly coloured. They spend the majority of their time on wet forest floors, eating snails, insects and similar invertebrates.

Blue-winged pitta (Pitta moluccensis) - U/WVPM+R/RB - WVPM: Bidadari, BBNP, BTNR, Bukit Batok West, CCNR, Hougang, Jurong Is., JLG, NTL, PRP, Poyan, Punggol Park, SBG, Sembawang Park, Tuas, WCP, Kranji Nature Trail. RB: P. Ubin (2016)
Fairy pitta (Pitta nympha) - VR/V - CCNR (2019), HNP (2021)
Hooded pitta (Pitta sordida) - U/WVPM - Bidadari, BTNR, CCNR, HNP, JLG, SBG, WCP
Mangrove pitta (Pitta megarhyncha) - R/RB - PRP, P. Ubin, P. Tekong, SBG, SBWR

Thornbills and allies
Order: PasseriformesFamily: Acanthizidae

Thornbills are small passerine birds, similar in habits to the tits.

Golden-bellied gerygone (Gerygone sulphurea) - C/RB - woodlands

Cuckooshrikes
Order: PasseriformesFamily: Campephagidae

The cuckooshrikes are small to medium-sized passerine birds. They are predominantly greyish with white and black, although some species are brightly coloured.

Scarlet minivet (Pericrocotus flammeus) - Ex/R - BTNR
Ashy minivet (Pericrocotus divaricatus) - C/WVPM - woodlands
Pied triller (Lalage nigra) - C/RB - woodlands
Lesser cuckooshrike (Coracina fimbriata) - VR/R - BTNR, CCNR

Whistlers and allies
Order: PasseriformesFamily: Pachycephalidae

The family Pachycephalidae includes the whistlers, shrikethrushes, and some of the pitohuis.

Mangrove whistler (Pachycephala grisola) - R/RB - Changi, Halus, JEG, LNR, P. Hantu, P. Semakau, P. Tekong, P. Ubin, SBWR

Old World orioles
Order: PasseriformesFamily: Oriolidae

The Old World orioles are colourful passerine birds. They are not related to the New World orioles.

Black-naped oriole (Oriolus chinensis) - C/RBWV - parks, woodlands, mangroves

Vangas, helmetshrikes, and allies 
Order: PasseriformesFamily: Vangidae

The family Vangidae is highly variable, though most members of it resemble true shrikes to some degree.

Large woodshrike (Tephrodornis gularis) - VR/NBV - CCNR (2016, 2018), P. Ubin (2022)
Black-winged flycatcher-shrike (Hemipus hirundinaceus) - VR/NBV - CCNR, P. Ubin

Ioras
Order: PasseriformesFamily: Aegithinidae

The ioras are bulbul-like birds of open forest or thorn scrub, but whereas that group tends to be drab in colouration, ioras are sexually dimorphic, with the males being brightly plumaged in yellows and greens.

Common iora (Aegithina tiphia) - C/RB - woodlands

Fantails
Order: PasseriformesFamily: Rhipiduridae

The fantails are small insectivorous birds which are specialist aerial feeders.

Malaysian pied-fantail (Rhipidura javanica) - C/RB - woodlands, mangroves

Drongos
Order: PasseriformesFamily: Dicruridae

The drongos are mostly black or dark grey in colour, sometimes with metallic tints. They have long forked tails, and some Asian species have elaborate tail decorations. They have short legs and sit very upright when perched, like a shrike. They flycatch or take prey from the ground.

Black drongo (Dicrurus macrocercus) - U/WVPM - Changi, Halus, NTL, P. Punggol, Poyan, Punggol, SBWR, Seletar, Tuas
Ashy drongo (Dicrurus leucophaeus) - R/WV - Bidadari, BBNP, CCNR, CBP, MFP, P. Semakau, SBG, TBHP
Crow-billed drongo (Dicrurus annectens) - U/WVPM - Bidadari, CCNR, Changi, Fort Canning, Halus, MFP, NTL, P. Ubin, PRP, SBG, SBWR, Sentosa, St. John Is., Tuas
Hair-crested drongo (Dicrurus hottentottus) - VR/V - CBP
Greater racket-tailed drongo (Dicrurus paradiseus) - C/RB - forests

Monarch flycatchers
Order: PasseriformesFamily: Monarchidae

The monarch flycatchers are small to medium-sized insectivorous passerines which hunt by flycatching.

Black-naped monarch (Hypothymis azurea) - VR/R - CCNR, Clementi Woods, JLG, P. Tekong, P. Ubin, SBG
Japanese paradise-flycatcher (Terpsiphone atrocaudata) - R/PM - BAMKP, Bidadari, BTNR, CCNR, JLG, Kranji Marsh, PRP, P. Hantu, SBWR, TBHP, TEG, Tuas
Amur paradise-flycatcher (Terpsiphone incei) - C/WVPM - forests, woodlands
Blyth's paradise-flycatcher (Terpsiphone affinis) - C/WVPM - forests, woodlands
Indian paradise-flycatcher (Terpsiphone paradisi) - VR/V - SBWR

Shrikes
Order: PasseriformesFamily: Laniidae

Shrikes are passerine birds known for their habit of catching other birds and small animals and impaling the uneaten portions of their bodies on thorns. A typical shrike's beak is hooked, like a bird of prey.

Tiger shrike (Lanius tigrinus) - C/WVPM - woodlands
Brown shrike (Lanius cristatus) - C/WVPM - grasslands, woodlands
Long-tailed shrike (Lanius schach) - C/RB - grasslands

Crows, jays, and magpies
Order: PasseriformesFamily: Corvidae

The family Corvidae includes crows, ravens, jays, choughs, magpies, treepies, nutcrackers and ground jays. Corvids are above average in size among the Passeriformes, and some of the larger species show high levels of intelligence.

Black magpie (Platysmurus leucopterus) - VR/NBV - HNP (2021)
House crow (Corvus splendens) - VC/IRB - islandwide
Large-billed crow (Corvus macrorhynchos) - C/RB - forested areas

Tits, chickadees, and titmice
Order: PasseriformesFamily: Paridae

The Paridae are mainly small stocky woodland species with short stout bills. Some have crests. They are adaptable birds, with a mixed diet including seeds and insects.

Japanese tit (Parus minor) - VR/V - JLG, PRP, Tuas

Larks
Order: PasseriformesFamily: Alaudidae

Larks are small terrestrial birds with often extravagant songs and display flights. Most larks are fairly dull in appearance. Their food is insects and seeds.

Eurasian skylark (Alauda arvensis) - VR/V - Pandan Reservoir (2018)

Cisticolas and allies
Order: PasseriformesFamily: Cisticolidae

The Cisticolidae are warblers found mainly in warmer southern regions of the Old World. They are generally very small birds of drab brown or grey appearance found in open country such as grassland or scrub.

Common tailorbird (Orthotomus sutorius) - C/RB - scrubby areas
Dark-necked tailorbird (Orthotomus atrogularis) - C/RB - forests
Ashy tailorbird (Orthotomus ruficeps) - C/RB - mangroves
Rufous-tailed tailorbird (Orthotomus sericeus) - U/RB - forests
Yellow-bellied prinia (Prinia flaviventris) - C/RB - grasslands
Zitting cisticola (Cisticola juncidis) - C/RB - grasslands

Reed warblers and allies
Order: PasseriformesFamily: Acrocephalidae

The members of this family are usually rather large for "warblers". Most are rather plain olivaceous brown above with much yellow to beige below. They are usually found in open woodland, reedbeds, or tall grass. The family occurs mostly in southern to western Eurasia and surroundings, but it also ranges far into the Pacific, with some species in Africa.

Booted warbler (Iduna caligata) - VR/V - Kranji Marsh (2017-8)
Black-browed reed warbler (Acrocephalus bistrigiceps) - U/WV - Changi, Halus, JLG, NTL, Punggol, SFW, SBWR, Tuas, Marina South
Oriental reed warbler (Acrocephalus orientalis) - C/WV - marshes, woodlands near water

Grassbirds and allies
Order: PasseriformesFamily: Locustellidae

Locustellidae are a family of small insectivorous songbirds found mainly in Eurasia, Africa, and the Australian region. They are smallish birds with tails that are usually long and pointed, and tend to be drab brownish or buffy all over.

Pallas's grasshopper-warbler (Helopsaltes certhiola) - U/WVPM - Changi, Halus, SFW, Tuas
Lanceolated warbler (Locustella lanceolata) - U/WVPM - Marina East, NTL, P. Punggol, Punggol, SFW, Tuas

Swallows
Order: PasseriformesFamily: Hirundinidae

The family Hirundinidae is adapted to aerial feeding. They have a slender streamlined body, long pointed wings and a short bill with a wide gape. The feet are adapted to perching rather than walking, and the front toes are partially joined at the base.

Bank swallow (Riparia riparia) - U/WVPM - BTNR, CCNR, Changi, Halus, Kranji Marsh, LSD, Marina East, NTL, P. Punggol
Barn swallow (Hirundo rustica) - VC/WVPM - islandwide (including offshore islands)
Pacific swallow (Hirundo tahitica) - C/RB - islandwide (including offshore islands)
Red-rumped swallow (Cecropis daurica) - U/WVPM - Admiralty Park, BTNR, CCKC, CCNR, Changi, Halus, Henderson Waves, LSD, Marina East, Poyan, Punggol, TEG, Tuas
Common house-martin (Delichon urbicum) - VR/V - Marina East, NTL
Asian house-martin (Delichon dasypus) - R/PM - BTNR, CCNR, Changi, Henderson Waves, NTL

Bulbuls
Order: PasseriformesFamily: Pycnonotidae

Bulbuls are medium-sized songbirds. Some are colourful with yellow, red or orange vents, cheeks, throats or supercilia, but most are drab, with uniform olive-brown to black plumage. Some species have distinct crests.

Black-and-white bulbul (Brachypodius melanoleucus) - VR/NBV - CCNR (2012), P. Ubin (2022)
Black-headed bulbul (Brachypodius melanocephalos) - R/RB - BBC, BTNR, CCNR, P. Ubin, PRP
Black-crested bulbul (Rubigula flaviventris) - R/IR - BTNR
Straw-headed bulbul (Pycnonotus zeylanicus) - U/RB - BBC, BBNP, BTNR, Choa Chu Kang, CCNR, DFNP, HNP, NTL, Poyan, P. Ubin
Red-whiskered bulbul (Pycnonotus jocosus) - U/IRB - Changi, Halus, JLG, Marina East, Poyan, P. Punggol, P. Ubin, Saddle Club, SBG, Sentosa, S. Serangoon
Sooty-headed bulbul (Pycnonotus aurigaster) - U/IRB - BAMKP, Halus, Marina East, NTL, P. Punggol, PRP, Punggol, S. Serangoon, TEG
Yellow-vented bulbul (Pycnonotus goiavier) - VC/RB - parks
Olive-winged bulbul (Pycnonotus plumosus) - C/RB - BTNR, CCNR, DFNP, P. Hantu, P. Ubin, PRP, SBG, SBWR
Cream-vented bulbul (Pycnonotus simplex) - U/RB - BTNR, CCNR
Red-eyed bulbul (Pycnonotus brunneus) - U/RB - BBNP, BTNR, CCNR, DFNP
Buff-vented bulbul (Iole olivacea) - VR/NBV - BTNR
Cinereous bulbul (Hemixos cinereus) - U/NBV - Bidadari, BBNP, BTNR, CCNR, JLG, KRP, Lazarus Is., NTL, P. Ubin, SBTB, SBWR, TBHP, Tuas, Marina South
Streaked bulbul (Ixos malaccensis) - R/NBV - BBNP, BTNR, Central Catchment, Changi Village, KRP, SBWR, Tuas

Leaf warblers
Order: PasseriformesFamily: Phylloscopidae

Leaf warblers are a family of small insectivorous birds found mostly in Eurasia and ranging into Wallacea and Africa. The species are of various sizes, often green-plumaged above and yellow below, or more subdued with greyish-green to greyish-brown colours.

Yellow-browed warbler (Phylloscopus inornatus) - R/WVPM - BBNP, BTNR, Bidadari, CCNR, DFNP, MFP, NTL, P. Hantu, Sentosa
Dusky warbler (Phylloscopus fuscatus) - VR/PM - Marina East (2021-2), Tuas (1994, 1995), Yishun Pond (2019)
Eastern crowned warbler (Phylloscopus coronatus) - U/WV - Bidadari, BTNR, CCNR, Changi, DFNP, PRP, SBWR, York Road
Pale-legged leaf warbler (Phylloscopus tenellipes) - VR/V - CCNR (2021)
Sakhalin leaf warbler (Phylloscopus borealoides) - VR/WV - BTNR (2018), CCNR (2014, 2021), DFNP (2014)
Arctic warbler (Phylloscopus borealis) - C/WVPM - parks, woodlands

White-eyes, yuhinas, and allies
Order: PasseriformesFamily: Zosteropidae

The white-eyes are small and mostly undistinguished, their plumage above being generally some dull colour like greenish-olive, but some species have a white or bright yellow throat, breast or lower parts, and several have buff flanks. As their name suggests, many species have a white ring around each eye.

Swinhoe's white-eye (Zosterops simplex) - C/rIRB - woodlands

Tree-babblers, scimitar-babblers, and allies
Order: PasseriformesFamily: Timaliidae

The babblers, or timaliids, are somewhat diverse in size and colouration, but are characterised by soft fluffy plumage.

Pin-striped tit-babbler (Mixornis gularis) - C/RB - forested areas
Chestnut-winged babbler (Cyanoderma erythropterum) - U/RB - CCNR

Ground babblers and allies
Order: PasseriformesFamily: Pellorneidae

These small to medium-sized songbirds have soft fluffy plumage but are otherwise rather diverse. Members of the genus Illadopsis are found in forests, but some other genera are birds of scrublands.

Moustached babbler (Malacopteron magnirostre) - Ex/RB - CCNR
Short-tailed babbler (Pellorneum malaccense) - U/RB - BTNR, CCNR
White-chested babbler (Pellorneum rostratum) - Ex/RB - CCNR, Kranji Marsh, P. Tekong, P. Ubin, SBWR
Abbott's babbler (Malacocincla abbotti) - U/RB - BTNR, CCNR, JEG, NTL, P. Ubin, Sentosa, SBG, SBWR, WCPR

Laughingthrushes and allies
Order: PasseriformesFamily: Leiothrichidae

The members of this family are diverse in size and colouration, though those of genus Turdoides tend to be brown or greyish. The family is found in Africa, India, and southeast Asia.

White-crested laughingthrush (Garrulax leucolophus) - C/IRB - woodlands
Chinese hwamei (Garrulax canorus) - R/IRB - Bt. Gombak, Sentosa, KRP, MFP

Nuthatches
Order: PasseriformesFamily: Sittidae

Nuthatches are small woodland birds. They have the unusual ability to climb down trees head first, unlike other birds which can only go upwards. Nuthatches have big heads, short tails and powerful bills and feet. 

Velvet-fronted nuthatch (Sitta frontalis) - A

Starlings
Order: PasseriformesFamily: Sturnidae

Starlings are small to medium-sized passerine birds. Their flight is strong and direct and they are very gregarious. Their preferred habitat is fairly open country. They eat insects and fruit. Plumage is typically dark with a metallic sheen.

Asian glossy starling (Aplonis panayensis) - VC/RB - islandwide
Common hill myna (Gracula religiosa) - C/RB - Admiralty Park, AMKTGW, Bidadari, BBNP, BTNR, CCNR, DFNP, Poyan, P. Ubin, SBG, Southern Ridges
European starling (Sturnus vulgaris) - VR/V - Marina East (2021)
Rosy starling (Pastor roseus) - R/WV - Changi, Halus, Jurong Is., JLG, KRP, St John Is., Tuas
Daurian starling (Agropsar sturninus) - VC/WVPM - woodlands
Chestnut-cheeked starling (Agropsar philippensis) - VR/V - Bidadari (2014), Loyang (1987), Henderson Waves (2019), JLG (2020)
Asian pied starling (Gracupica contra) - R/I
White-shouldered starling (Sturnia sinensis) - U/WVPM - Changi, Coney Is., KRP, Halus, Punggol, Seletar, Tuas
Brahminy starling (Sturnia pagodarum) - VR/V - Bidadari, JLG, Marina East, P. Punggol
Red-billed starling (Spodiopsar sericeus) - VR/PM - SBTB (2013), TEG (2015), Turut Track (2021)
White-cheeked starling (Spodiopsar cineraceus) - VR/V - Seletar End (2020)
Common myna (Acridotheres tristis) - C/RB - islandwide (including offshore islands)
Black-winged starling (Acridotheres melanopterus) - Ex/IRB
Javan myna (Acridotheres javanicus) - VC/IRB - islandwide (including offshore islands)
Crested myna (Acridotheres cristatellus) - Ex/IR
Great myna ( Acridotheres grandis) - VC/IRB

Thrushes and allies
Order: PasseriformesFamily: Turdidae

The thrushes are a group of passerine birds that occur mainly in the Old World. They are plump, soft plumaged, small to medium-sized insectivores or sometimes omnivores, often feeding on the ground. Many have attractive songs.

Siberian thrush (Geokichla sibirica) - R/PM - Bidadari, BTNR, CCNR, DFNP, KRP, JLG, Sentosa, Tuas
Orange-headed thrush (Geokichla citrina) - R/WV - Bidadari, BTNR, CCNR, DFNP, HNP, SBG, WCP
Chinese blackbird (Turdus mandarinus) - VR/V - JLG (2020)
Eyebrowed thrush (Turdus obscurus) - R/WVPM - Bidadari, BTNR, CCNR, KRP, NTL, P. Ubin, SBG, TBHP, Tuas

Old World flycatchers
Order: PasseriformesFamily: Muscicapidae

Old World flycatchers are a large group of small passerine birds native to the Old World. They are mainly small arboreal insectivores. The appearance of these birds is highly varied, but they mostly have weak songs and harsh calls.

Gray-streaked flycatcher (Muscicapa griseisticta) - VR/PM - Sembawang (2021)
Dark-sided flycatcher (Muscicapa sibirica) - U/WVPM - Bidadari, BBNP, BTNR, CCNR, DFNP, NTL, SBG, Southern Ridges
Ferruginous flycatcher (Muscicapa ferruginea) - U/WVPM - Bidadari, CCNR, JLG, SBG
Asian brown flycatcher (Muscicapa dauurica) - C/WVPM - woodlands
Brown-streaked flycatcher (Muscicapa williamsoni) - R/WVPM - BBNP, Bidadari, CCKP, CCNR, JLG, MFP, PRP, SBWR
Spotted flycatcher (Muscicapa striata) - VR/V - KRP (2021)
Oriental magpie-robin (Copsychus saularis) - U/RB - woodlands
White-rumped shama (Copsychus malabaricus) - R/RB - BBNP, BTNR, CCNR, DFNP, MFP, Poyan, P. Tekong, P. Ubin, SBWR
Chinese blue flycatcher (Cyornis glaucicomans) - VR/PM - Bidadari (2013), CCNR (2020), JLG (2020), SBWR (1997)
Mangrove blue flycatcher (Cyornis rufigastra) - VR/RB - Bidadari (2015), P. Tekong, P. Ubin, SBWR
Brown-chested jungle-flycatcher (Cyornis brunneatus) - R/WVPM - BBNP, Bidadari, BTNR, CCKP, CCNR, DFNP, Jurong Is., JLG, SBG, SBWR, Sentosa, St John Is., TEG, Tuas
Blue-and-white flycatcher (Cyanoptila cyanomelana) - R/PM - Bidadari, BBNP, BTNR, CCNR, DFNP, Sentosa
Zappey's flycatcher (Cyanoptila cumatilis) - R/PM - Bidadari, BBNP, BTNR, CCNR, DFNP, JLG, KRP, SBG, TEG, Tuas
Verditer flycatcher (Eumyias thalassinus) - VR/NBV - DFNP (2017)
Siberian blue robin (Luscinia cyane) - U/WVPM - Bidadari, BTNR, CCNR, P. Ubin, SBG, SBWR
Blue whistling-thrush (Myophonus caeruleus caeruleus) - VR/Indeterminate - Fort Canning (2019)
Yellow-rumped flycatcher (Ficedula zanthopygia) - C/PM - woodlands, forests
Green-backed flycatcher (Ficedula elisae) - R/WVPM - BAMKP, Bidadari, CCNR, KRP, NTL, Tuas, Khatib Bongsu, Marina South
Narcissus flycatcher (Ficedula narcissina) - VR/PM - Bidadari (2015), DFNP (2017)
Mugimaki flycatcher (Ficedula mugimaki) - U/PM - AMKTGW, Bidadari, BBNP, BTNR, CCNR, JLG, KRP, MFP, PRP, Sentosa, Tuas
Taiga flycatcher (Ficedula albicilla) - VR/V - SBG (2019–20), WCP (2020)
Black redstart (Phoenicurus ochruros) - VR/V - Jambol Walk (2021)
Daurian redstart (Phoenicurus auroreus) - R/V - SBTB (2013), Cashew Road (2014), SBG (2019), UTown (2020)
White-throated rock-thrush (Monticola gularis) - VR/WVPM - BTNR
Blue rock-thrush (Monticola solitarius) - R/PM - Ascentia Sky, BTNR, Labrador Villa Road, Marina Barrage, Pinnacle@Duxton, Sentosa, Tuas
Siberian stonechat (Saxicola maurus) - R/WVPM - Changi, Halus, NTL, Poyan, P. Punggol, Tuas, Warren, Marina South, Punggol

Flowerpeckers
Order: PasseriformesFamily: Dicaeidae

The flowerpeckers are very small, stout, often brightly coloured birds, with short tails, short thick curved bills and tubular tongues.

Scarlet-breasted flowerpecker (Prionochilus thoracicus) - VR/NBV - BTNR (2021), P. Ubin (2015, 2022)
Thick-billed flowerpecker (Dicaeum agile) - VR/NBV - BBNP, BTNR, CCNR, DFNP
Yellow-vented flowerpecker (Dicaeum chrysorrheum) - VR/R - BBNP, BTNR, CCNR, DFNP
Orange-bellied flowerpecker (Dicaeum trigonostigma) - C/RB - forests
Scarlet-backed flowerpecker (Dicaeum cruentatum) - C/RB - parks

Sunbirds and spiderhunters

Order: PasseriformesFamily: Nectariniidae

The sunbirds and spiderhunters are very small passerine birds which feed largely on nectar, although they will also take insects, especially when feeding young. Flight is fast and direct on their short wings. Most species can take nectar by hovering like a hummingbird, but usually perch to feed.

Ruby-cheeked sunbird (Chalcoparia singalensis) - VR/R - CCNR, P. Ubin, SBWR
Plain sunbird (Anthreptes simplex) - VR/R - CCNR, Senoko
Brown-throated sunbird (Anthreptes malacensis) - C/RB - parks
Van Hasselt's sunbird (Leptocoma brasiliana) - U/RB - BBNP, BTNR, CCNR, P. Ubin
Copper-throated sunbird (Leptocoma calcostetha) - U/RB - BBNP, P. Ubin, SBWR
Olive-backed sunbird (Cinnyris jugularis) - VC/RB - parks
Crimson sunbird (Aethopyga siparaja) - C/RB - parks, forests
Thick-billed spiderhunter (Arachnothera crassirostris) - VR/R - BTNR, CCNR
Little spiderhunter (Arachnothera longirostra) - U/RB - BBNP, BTNR, CCNR, DFNP, Mandai, P. Ubin
Yellow-eared spiderhunter (Arachnothera chrysogenys) - VR/R - BTNR, CCNR, P. Tekong, P. Ubin

Fairy-bluebirds
Order: PasseriformesFamily: Irenidae

The fairy-bluebirds are bulbul-like birds of open forest or thorn scrub. The males are dark-blue and the females a duller green.

Asian fairy-bluebird (Irena puella) - C/RB - BBNP, BBC, BTNR, CCNR, DFNP

Leafbirds
Order: PasseriformesFamily: Chloropseidae

The leafbirds are small, bulbul-like birds. The males are brightly plumaged, usually in greens and yellows.

Greater green leafbird (Chloropsis sonnerati) - U/RB - BTNR, CCNR
Lesser green leafbird (Chloropsis cyanopogon) - R/RB - BTNR, CCNR, P. Ubin
Blue-winged leafbird (Chloropsis cochinchinensis) - U/RB - BTNR, CCNR

Weavers and allies
Order: PasseriformesFamily: Ploceidae

The weavers are small passerine birds related to the finches. They are seed-eating birds with rounded conical bills. The males of many species are brightly coloured, usually in red or yellow and black, some species show variation in colour only in the breeding season.

Golden-backed weaver (Ploceus jacksoni) - U/IRB - Coney Is., Halus, Marina East, NTL, P. Punggol
Streaked weaver (Ploceus manyar) - R/IRB - Halus, SBWR, Khatib Bongsu, Sg. Serangoon
Baya weaver (Ploceus philippinus) - C/RB - grasslands

Waxbills and allies
Order: PasseriformesFamily: Estrildidae

The estrildid finches are small passerine birds of the Old World tropics and Australasia. They are gregarious and often colonial seed eaters with short thick but pointed bills. They are all similar in structure and habits, but have wide variation in plumage colours and patterns.

Orange-cheeked waxbill (Estrilda melpoda) - U/I - BAMKP, Coney Is., JLG, NTL, P. Punggol, S. Pandan, SBTB
Common waxbill (Estrilda astrild) - U/I - Coney Is., Halus, JLG, Marina East, NTL, P. Punggol, Punggol, SBWR
Crimson-rumped waxbill (Estrilda rhodopyga) - U/I - Coney Is., Halus, P. Punggol, Punggol
Red avadavat (Amandava amandava) - U/IRB - BAMKP, Changi, Halus, NTL, P. Punggol, Tuas, Marina South, Punggol
White-rumped munia (Lonchura striata) - R/RB - BTNR, CCNR, DFNP, Halus, NTL, P. Tekong, P. Ubin, SBG, SBWR, Sentosa, Tuas, Telok Blangah
Javan munia (Lonchura leucogastroides) - U/IRB - Bidadari, Halus, Hort Park, Marina East, Murai, SBTB, Serangoon Reservoir, SBWR, BAMKP
Scaly-breasted munia (Lonchura punctulata) - C/RB - grasslands
Chestnut munia (Lonchura atricapilla) - U/RB - grasslands
White-capped munia (Lonchura ferruginosa) - VR/I - Punggol
White-headed munia (Lonchura maja) - U/RB - grasslands

Indigobirds
Order: PasseriformesFamily: Viduidae

The indigobirds are finch-like species which usually have black or indigo predominating in their plumage. All are brood parasites which lay their eggs in the nests of estrildid finches.

Pin-tailed whydah (Vidua macroura) - R/I - Changi, NTL, P. Punggol

Old World sparrows
Order: PasseriformesFamily: Passeridae

Old World sparrows are small passerine birds. In general, sparrows tend to be small, plump, brown or grey birds with short tails and short powerful beaks. Sparrows are seed eaters, but they also consume small insects.

House sparrow (Passer domesticus) - R/IRB - Jurong Is., Tuas South
Eurasian tree sparrow (Passer montanus) - VC/RB - urban areas

Wagtails and pipits
Order: PasseriformesFamily: Motacillidae

Motacillidae is a family of small passerine birds with medium to long tails. They include the wagtails, longclaws and pipits. They are slender, ground feeding insectivores of open country.

Forest wagtail (Dendronanthus indicus) - U/WVPM - Admiralty Park, BBNP, Bidadari, BTNR, CCNR, Jurong Central Park, Mandai, P. Ubin, Sembawang, Simpang, SBWR, Yishun
Gray wagtail (Motacilla cinerea) - U/WVPM - Admiralty Park, BAMKP, Bedok, Bt Batok, BTNR, Buona Vista, CCNR, Changi, JLG, Marsiling Park, Punggol, P. Punggol, P. Ubin, Sembawang, Simpang, Yishun
Eastern yellow wagtail (Motacilla tschutschensis) - C/WV - Bidadari, Changi, Halus, LSD, NTL, P. Punggol, P. Ubin, Punggol, Sembawang, Yishun
Citrine wagtail (Motacilla citreola) - VR/WV - NTL (2018), Punggol (1989), Tuas (1994)
White wagtail (Motacilla alba) - U/WV - BAMKP, BBC, Buona Vista, Changi, Jurong West, Marina East, NTL, P. Punggol, Punggol, SBG, TEG, Yishun
Paddyfield pipit (Anthus rufulus) - C/RB - grassfields
Tree pipit (Anthus trivialis) - A
Olive-backed pipit (Anthus hodgsoni) - VR/PM - Bidadari (2010)
Red-throated pipit (Anthus cervinus) - R/WV - Changi, P. Punggol, Seletar East, Tuas

Old World buntings
Order: PasseriformesFamily: Emberizidae

The emberizids are a large family of passerine birds. They are seed-eating birds with distinctively shaped bills. Many emberizid species have distinctive head patterns.

Black-headed bunting (Emberiza melanocephala) - Indeterminate
Yellow-breasted bunting (Emberiza aureola) - VR/WV - ''Marina East'

See also
Lists of birds by region
List of mammals of Singapore
List of reptiles of Singapore
List of amphibians of Singapore

References

 
Birds
Singapore
Singapore